Triatoma platensis is a species of assassin bug in the family Reduviidae. It is found in South America.

References

Further reading

 
 

Reduviidae
Articles created by Qbugbot
Insects described in 1913